Martin Kampmann Frederiksen (born April 17, 1982) is a retired Danish professional mixed martial artist who competed in the Ultimate Fighting Championship. He is a former Cage Warriors World Middleweight Champion.

Background
Originally from Aarhus, Denmark, Kampmann began training in wrestling at  the age of eight and trained for two years moving to karate at the age of 14 before transitioning into Muay Thai and boxing, competing in both as an amateur. In 2000, Kampmann began training in submission wrestling and Brazilian jiu-jitsu, before turning to mixed martial arts.

Mixed martial arts career

Early career
Kampmann compiled an amateur mixed martial arts record of 8-1 before turning professional in 2003 while attending college as an engineering student. Kampmann then compiled a professional record of 9–1, capturing the Cage Warriors Middleweight Championship in the process, before being signed by the UFC.

Ultimate Fighting Championship
Kampmann competed for many years in the Ultimate Fighting Championship. He initially fought as a middleweight, where he made his debut at UFC Fight Night 6 as a late replacement for Kalib Starnes. In his debut fight with the UFC, Kampmann defeated Crafton Wallace by first-round submission. His next victory came by way of unanimous decision over future top contender Thales Leites in The Ultimate Fighter 4 Finale on November 11, 2006. At UFC 68, after being wobbled and knocked down numerous times, Kampmann showed his toughness and resilience by defeating Drew McFedries via arm-triangle choke late in the first round.

His next UFC fight was scheduled for UFC 72 against former UFC Middleweight Champion Rich Franklin, but he was forced to withdraw due to a knee injury. Kampmann returned from his injury at UFC 85, where he defeated the heavy-handed Jorge Rivera by guillotine choke at 2:44 in the first round.

After a first-round TKO defeat to Nate Marquardt at UFC 88, Kampmann announced that he would drop down to the Welterweight division. He made his debut in the division at UFC 93 defeating newcomer Alexandre Barros by TKO in the second round. Kampmann then defeated the last reigning WEC Welterweight Champion Carlos Condit in a closely contested fight via split decision in the main event of UFC Fight Night 18.

Kampmann was to fight Mike Swick on September 19, 2009, at UFC 103. The winner was to receive a title shot against Georges St-Pierre. On September 4, it was announced that Swick had suffered an injury while training for their upcoming bout. Paul Daley replaced Swick for the fight. With Swick pulling out, the fight was not for the number-one contender spot anymore, as Daley was making his UFC debut. In an upset, Kampmann fell to the British fighter by TKO due to punches just 2:31 into the bout.

Kampmann was expected to face Rory Markham on January 2, 2010, at UFC 108. However, Markham was forced out of the bout with an injury and replaced by Jacob Volkmann. Kampmann won via first-round submission using a modified guillotine choke that he calls the "Deathchoke".

Kampmann was scheduled to face Ben Saunders at UFC 111., but was forced off the card with an injury and replaced by Jake Ellenberger.

Kampmann's next fight was against Brazilian Paulo Thiago at UFC 115. Kampmann controlled and dominated Thiago en route to a unanimous decision victory by a score of 30–27 on all three judges scorecards.

Kampmann faced former EliteXC Welterweight Champion and former Strikeforce Middleweight Champion and UFC debutant Jake Shields, on October 23, 2010, at UFC 121. He lost a controversial split decision to Shields.

Kampmann then lost another controversial decision to Diego Sanchez on March 3, 2011, at UFC Live: Sanchez vs. Kampmann. The bout saw Kampmann outstrike and stagger Sanchez over three rounds (including dropping Sanchez with a punch in the first round), with Sanchez's relentless pace and aggression giving him the nod on all three scorecards. Kampmann stopped 14 out of Sanchez's 15 takedown attempts, and also out-landed him 79–51 in total strikes (according to FightMetric, which scored the fight 29-28 Kampmann). The bout earned Fight of the Night honors.

Kampmann was expected to face John Howard on June 26, 2011, at UFC on Versus 4 However, Kampmann was forced out of the bout with an injury and replaced by Matt Brown.

Kampmann defeated Rick Story via split decision on November 19, 2011, at UFC 139. Dana White incorrectly reported at the post fight press conference that the judge's scores had been tabulated incorrectly and should have been announced as unanimous decision in favor of Kampmann.  According to the California State Athletic Commission's website and confirmed by MMADecisions.com, judge Susan Thomas-Gitlin in fact scored the fight in favor of Story.

Kampmann then faced former number-one contender Thiago Alves on March 3, 2012, at UFC on FX 2. After being rocked late, Kampmann latched a guillotine choke onto Alves with one minute remaining in the third round, forcing him to tap. For his performance, Kampmann was awarded Submission of the Night honors.

Kampmann faced Jake Ellenberger on June 1, 2012, at The Ultimate Fighter 15 Finale. After a first round which saw Kampmann nearly finished after being knocked down by Ellenberger, Kampmann defeated Ellenberger via second-round knockout due to a series of knees. The performance also earned Kampmann Knockout of the Night honors.

Kampmann faced Johny Hendricks on November 17, 2012, at UFC 154. He lost the fight via knockout in the first round.

Kampmann faced Carlos Condit in a rematch on August 28, 2013, at UFC Fight Night 27. After Kampmann controlled the action for most of the first round, Condit dominated the remainder of the fight, finishing Kampmann via TKO in the fourth round.  Despite the loss, Kampmann was rewarded for his efforts by earning his second Fight of the Night bonus award.

On January 9, 2014, Kampmann said that he was going to take a hiatus from fighting; he was not retiring, but needed a break.  While still maintaining a "hiatus," and not ready to publicly announce his retirement from fighting, Kampmann was named full-time coach of Team Alpha Male, based in Sacramento, California in September 2014.

On January 6, 2016, Kampmann publicly confirmed his decision to retire.

Poker career
In 2014, Kampmann began playing poker with Ultimate Poker with the help of professional poker player, Jason Somerville. Kampmann began this relationship as a guest on Somerville's show, Run it UP. Kampmann went on to play in multiple online and live tournaments with the sponsorship of Ultimate Poker including the Nevada Poker Challenge and the World Series of Poker Main Event. Kampmann took down the Nevada Poker Challenge and pocketed over $52,000. Although, he didn't place inside the money in the 2014 WSOP Main Event, Kampmann made an extremely deep run outlasting fellow Ultimate Poker pros Jason Somerville, Antonio Esfandiari, Danielle Andersen, Dan O'Brien and Bruce Buffer.

Personal life
Kampmann is married and has two sons. He is close friend to fighters such as Randy Couture and Ray Sefo.

Championships and accomplishments

Mixed martial arts 
 Ultimate Fighting Championship
 Fight of the Night (Two times) vs. Carlos Condit, Diego Sanchez 
 Knockout of the Night (One time) vs. Jake Ellenberger 
 Submission of the Night (Two times) vs. Drew McFedries, Thiago Alves 
 Cage Warriors Fighting Championship
 CWFC Middleweight Championship (One time)
 One successful title defence
Nordic MMA Awards - MMAviking.com
2012 Submission of the Year vs. Thiago Alves

Mixed martial arts record 

|-
| Loss
| align=center| 20–7
| Carlos Condit
| TKO (punches and knees)
| UFC Fight Night: Condit vs. Kampmann 2
| 
| align=center| 4
| align=center| 0:54
| Indianapolis, Indiana, United States
| 
|-
| Loss
| align=center| 20–6
| Johny Hendricks
| KO (punch)
| UFC 154
| 
| align=center| 1
| align=center| 0:46
| Montreal, Quebec, Canada
| 
|-
| Win
| align=center| 20–5
| Jake Ellenberger
| TKO (knee)
| The Ultimate Fighter 15 Finale
| 
| align=center| 2
| align=center| 1:40
| Las Vegas, Nevada, United States
| 
|-
| Win
| align=center| 19–5
| Thiago Alves
| Submission (guillotine choke)
| UFC on FX: Alves vs. Kampmann
| 
| align=center| 3
| align=center| 4:12
| Sydney, Australia
| 
|-
| Win
| align=center| 18–5
| Rick Story
| Decision (split)
| UFC 139
| 
| align=center| 3
| align=center| 5:00
| San Jose, California, United States
| 
|-
| Loss
| align=center| 17–5
| Diego Sanchez
| Decision (unanimous)
| UFC Live: Sanchez vs. Kampmann
| 
| align=center| 3
| align=center| 5:00
| Louisville, Kentucky, United States
| 
|-
| Loss
| align=center| 17–4
| Jake Shields
| Decision (split)
| UFC 121
| 
| align=center| 3
| align=center| 5:00
| Anaheim, California, United States
|
|-
| Win
| align=center| 17–3
| Paulo Thiago
| Decision (unanimous)
| UFC 115
| 
| align=center| 3
| align=center| 5:00
| Vancouver, British Columbia, Canada
| 
|-
| Win
| align=center| 16–3
| Jacob Volkmann
| Submission (guillotine choke)
| UFC 108
| 
| align=center| 1
| align=center| 4:03
| Las Vegas, Nevada, United States
| 
|-
| Loss
| align=center| 15–3
| Paul Daley
| TKO (punches)
| UFC 103
| 
| align=center| 1
| align=center| 2:31
| Dallas, Texas, United States
| 
|-
| Win
| align=center| 15–2
| Carlos Condit
| Decision (split)
| UFC Fight Night: Condit vs. Kampmann
| 
| align=center| 3
| align=center| 5:00
| Nashville, Tennessee, United States
| 
|-
| Win
| align=center| 14–2
| Alexandre Barros
| TKO (punches)
| UFC 93
| 
| align=center| 2
| align=center| 3:07
| Dublin, Ireland
| 
|-
| Loss
| align=center| 13–2
| Nate Marquardt
| TKO (punches)
| UFC 88
| 
| align=center| 1
| align=center| 1:22
| Atlanta, Georgia, United States
| 
|-
| Win
| align=center| 13–1
| Jorge Rivera
| Submission (guillotine choke)
| UFC 85
| 
| align=center| 1
| align=center| 2:44
| London, England
| 
|-
| Win
| align=center| 12–1
| Drew McFedries
| Submission (arm-triangle choke)
| UFC 68
| 
| align=center| 1
| align=center| 4:06
| Columbus, Ohio, United States
| 
|-
| Win
| align=center| 11–1
| Thales Leites
| Decision (unanimous)
| The Ultimate Fighter: The Comeback Finale
| 
| align=center| 3
| align=center| 5:00
| Las Vegas, Nevada, United States
| 
|-
| Win
| align=center| 10–1
| Crafton Wallace
| Submission (rear-naked choke)
| UFC Fight Night 6
| 
| align=center| 1
| align=center| 2:59
| Las Vegas, Nevada, United States
| 
|-
| Win
| align=center| 9–1
| Edwin Aguilar
| TKO (punches)
| WFA: King of the Streets
| 
| align=center| 1
| align=center| 2:43
| Los Angeles, California, United States
| 
|-
| Win
| align=center| 8–1
| Damien Riccio
| Submission (rear-naked choke)
| CWFC: Strike Force 4
| 
| align=center| 2
| align=center| 1:58
| Coventry, England
| 
|-
| Win
| align=center| 7–1
| Matt Ewin
| Submission (punches)
| CWFC: Strike Force 2
| 
| align=center| 1
| align=center| 2:45
| Coventry, England
| 
|-
| Win
| align=center| 6–1
| Brendan Seguin
| KO (head kick)
| KOTC: Warzone
| 
| align=center| 1
| align=center| 2:05
| Sheffield, England
| 
|-
| Win
| align=center| 5–1
| Matt Ewin
| TKO (retirement)
| HOP: Fight Night 2
| 
| align=center| 1
| align=center| 5:00
| Swansea, Wales
| 
|-
| Loss
| align=center| 4–1
| Andrei Semenov
| TKO (doctor stoppage)
| M-1 MFC: Middleweight GP
| 
| align=center| 1
| align=center| 1:21
| Saint Petersburg, Russia
| 
|-
| Win
| align=center| 4–0
| Xavier Foupa-Pokam
| DQ  
| EVT 2: Hazard
| 
| align=center| 2
| align=center| 0:27
| Stockholm, Sweden
| 
|-
| Win
| align=center| 3–0
| Toni Vivas
| TKO (punches)
| EVT 1: Genesis
| 
| align=center| 1
| align=center| 1:23
| Copenhagen, Denmark
| 
|-
| Win
| align=center| 2–0
| Dave Jones
| KO (knee)
| XFC 2: The Perfect Storm
| 
| align=center| 1
| align=center| N/A
| Cornwall, England
| 
|-
| Win
| align=center| 1–0
| Gert Mannaerts
| TKO (punches)
| Viking Fight 3: Rumble in the West
| 
| align=center| 1
| align=center| N/A
| Aarhus, Denmark
|

See also
 List of current UFC fighters
 List of male mixed martial artists

References

External links 
 
 
 

Living people
1982 births
Danish male mixed martial artists
Welterweight mixed martial artists
Middleweight mixed martial artists
Mixed martial artists utilizing Muay Thai
Mixed martial artists utilizing boxing
Mixed martial artists utilizing karate
Mixed martial artists utilizing Brazilian jiu-jitsu
Danish practitioners of Brazilian jiu-jitsu
Danish Muay Thai practitioners
Danish male karateka
Sportspeople from Aarhus
Danish expatriates in the United States
Ultimate Fighting Championship male fighters